The Statue of Mary Anning is a bronze sculpture of the paleontologist Mary Anning in Lyme Regis.

Inception and campaign
In August 2018, a campaign called "Mary Anning Rocks" was formed by an 11-year-old school girl from Dorset, Evie Swire, supported by her mother Anya Pearson. 

The campaign, in promoting a monument to a 19th century women scientist, aimed to highlight the bias in the number of UK statues of men rather than women (more than 85% men). Prior to the erection of Mary's statue in May 2022, there were three other statues to a woman in the Southwest of England; the 2019 statue of Nancy Astor in Plymouth, and the 1888 Statue of Queen Victoria in Bristol and the 1902 Statue of Queen Victoria in Weymouth.

Plans for launching the crowdfunding part of the campaign in May 2020 were placed on hold due to the COVID-19 pandemic in England, with the Mary Anning Rocks group selling t-shirts instead. In November 2020 the delayed public crowdfunding campaign was launched to raise the money to commission a statue of Mary Anning for her home town of Lyme Regis. 

Patrons and supporters of the campaign include Professor Alice Roberts, Sir David Attenborough and novelist Tracy Chevalier.

The statue
In January 2021 the campaign had raised over £70,000, enough for the sculpture to be produced by sculptor Denise Dutton. She produced a maquette of the piece, which was publicly displayed at the Marine Theatre in Lyme Regis on 22 May 2021, Anning's 222nd Birthday.  

Planning permission for the statue, at a site overlooking Black Ven (where Mary made many of her discoveries), was lodged in November 2021 and granted by Dorset Council in January 2022. The site is at the junction of Long Entry and Gun Cliff Walk in Lyme Regis.

Unveiling
The statue was publicly unveiled by Evie Swire and Alice Roberts on 21 May 2022, the 223rd anniversary of Anning's birth. The event was attended by hundreds of supporters including Tracy Chevalier, Hugh Torrens, Anjana Khatwa, Dean Lomax, and Tori Herridge. The actress Lizzie Hopley performed as Mary Anning.

References

External links

Video of the unveiling of the statue on 22 May 2022

2022 establishments in England
2022 sculptures
Bronze sculptures in England
History of Dorset
Lyme Regis
Monuments and memorials in England
Outdoor sculptures in England
Sculptures of women in the United Kingdom
Statues in England